Pizzo Centrale is a mountain in the Lepontine Alps, located on the border between the cantons of Uri and Ticino. At 2,999 metres above sea level, it is the highest summit overlooking Gotthard Pass from the east. Lago della Sella is located on its southern side. Over its northern side lies a glacier, named Ober Schatzfirn.

The summit can be reached by experienced hikers via a trail starting at Lago della Sella.

References

External links
Pizzo Centrale on Hikr.org

Mountains of the Alps
Mountains of Switzerland
Mountains of the canton of Uri
Mountains of Ticino
Ticino–Uri border
Lepontine Alps